"Better Get Used to It" is a song by Canadian rock band Big Sugar. It was released as the second single from  the band's 1998 album, Heated. Big Sugar also recorded a French version of the song for the band's 1999 EP, Chauffe à bloc. The band also made a music video of the French version of the song.

Charts
The song was successful in Canada, peaking at #17 on the RPM singles chart. It is the band's only song to have ever charted in the United States, peaking at #26 on the Billboard Heritage Rock chart in 1999.

References

1998 singles
Big Sugar songs
1998 songs
Songs written by Gavin Brown (musician)
A&M Records singles
Songs written by Gordie Johnson